Solanum habrochaites (syn. Lycopersicon hirsutum), the hairy tomato, is a species of flowering plant in the family Solanaceae, native to Ecuador and Peru. It is considered to be one of the most important sources of genetic variation for crop improvement of the cultivated tomato, Solanum lycopersicum.

References

habrochaites
Flora of Ecuador
Flora of Peru
Plants described in 1999